Coleophora carchara is a moth of the family Coleophoridae. It is found in China and Mongolia.

References

carchara
Moths described in 1972
Moths of Asia